Mechanism may refer to:

Mechanism (engineering), rigid bodies connected by joints in order to accomplish a desired force and/or motion transmission
Mechanism (biology), explaining how a feature is created
Mechanism (philosophy), a theory that all natural phenomena can be explained by physical causes
Mechanism (sociology), a theory that all social phenomena can be explained by the existence of a deterministic mechanism
 "The Mechanism", song by Disclosure
 The Mechanism (TV series), a Netflix TV series

See also
Machine
Machine (mechanical)
Linkage (mechanical)
Mechanism design, the art of designing rules of a game to achieve a specific outcome
Mechanism of action, the means by which a drug exerts its biological effects
Defence mechanism, unconscious mechanisms aimed at reducing anxiety 
Reaction mechanism, the sequence of reactions by which overall chemical change occurs
Antikythera mechanism, an ancient Greek analog computer
Theory of operation, a description of how a device or system should work